Vertambitus is a genus of the bivalves in the family Verticordiidae.

Species 

 Vertambitus affinis (Jaeckel & Thiele, 1931)
 Vertambitus cuneatus (Kuroda, 1952)
 Vertambitus excoriatus (Poutiers, 1984)
 Vertambitus torridus (Hedley, 1906)
 Vertambitus triangularis (Locard, 1898)
 Vertambitus vadosus (Hedley, 1907)

References 

Bivalve genera
Verticordiidae